Silvernails is the site of a railroad junction between the former Poughkeepsie and Connecticut Railroad and Rhinebeck and Connecticut Railroad, in Columbia County, New York, United States. It is located in Gallatin, just outside Pine Plains; an old railroad station still stands at the site.

References

Rail infrastructure in New York (state)
Hamlets in New York (state)
Hamlets in Dutchess County, New York